John Cooney (June 9, 1836 – January 20, 1894) was an American lawyer and politician from New York.

Life 
Cooney was born on June 9, 1836, in Albany, New York. He was of Irish descent.

Cooney attended The Albany Academy. He moved to Brooklyn in 1855 and was admitted to the bar two years later. He studied law under James T. Brady and defended a large number of murder cases.

A Democrat, Cooney was elected in 1889 to the New York State Assembly, representing the Kings County 3rd District. He served in the Assembly in 1890, 1891, 1892, and 1893.

He was an elected delegate to the 1894 New York Constitutional Convention, but he died before the convention.

Cooney died of pneumonia on January 20, 1894, in his home at 189 Dean Street. He was in poor health for at least a year beforehand. He was buried in Holy Cross Cemetery.

References

External links 
 Political Graveyard
 Find a Grave

1836 births
1894 deaths
Politicians from Brooklyn
Lawyers from Brooklyn
19th-century American politicians
Burials at Holy Cross Cemetery, Brooklyn
American people of Irish descent
Deaths from pneumonia in New York (state)
Lawyers from Albany, New York
Politicians from Albany, New York
The Albany Academy alumni
Democratic Party members of the New York State Assembly
19th-century American lawyers